The Old Schoolhouse Bridge is a historic covered bridge spanning the South Wheelock Branch of the Passumpsic River in Lyndon, Vermont.  It is located just south of South Wheelock Road, which it formerly carried.  Built in 1871, it is one five similar bridges in Lyndon.  It was listed on the National Register of Historic Places in 1971.

Description and history
The Old Schoolhouse Bridge is located south of downtown Lyndon, and just west of the interchange of Interstate 91 (I-91) and U.S. Route 5 (US 5). South Wheelock Road travels to the west from US 5 just south that interchange, quickly crossing the South Wheelock Branch. The covered bridge is located just south of the modern bridge carrying that road. It is a single-span king post truss,  in length. It is covered by a gabled metal roof, which extends beyond the trusses. The bridge originally had walkways on both sides, but the southern one has been removed. The trusses are clad in vertical board siding both on their outsides and insides, as is the half-wall on the outside of the walkway. Posts rise from that half-wall to the edge of the roof.

The bridge was built in 1871, and is believed to be the only surviving 19th-century covered bridge with covered walkways on both sides. It is one of five bridges in Lyndon, the only one to have its interior clad in siding. It was in active service until 1973, and is now open only to pedestrian traffic.

See also
 
 
 
 
 List of covered bridges in Vermont
 National Register of Historic Places listings in Caledonia County, Vermont
 List of bridges on the National Register of Historic Places in Vermont

References

Bridges completed in 1871
Covered bridges on the National Register of Historic Places in Vermont
Buildings and structures in Lyndon, Vermont
King post truss bridges in the United States
Covered bridges in Caledonia County, Vermont
National Register of Historic Places in Caledonia County, Vermont
Road bridges on the National Register of Historic Places in Vermont
Wooden bridges in Vermont
1871 establishments in Vermont